Kai Juhani Niemi (born 15 September 1955 in Pori, Finland) is a former international motorcycle speedway rider who represented the Finland national speedway team.

Career
He reached four World Championship finals, finishing a career best fourth in 1985 at the Odsal Stadium in Bradford, England. The performance in 1985 from a rider from the minor nations of speedway came as a surprise to many and he was level on points with three other riders leading into the last set of heats but was unable to score in heat 17, which resulted in a fourth place finish.

Niemi won the Finnish National Championship a record nine times during his career (1977, 1978, 1979, 1980, 1981, 1982, 1984, 1988 and 1990)

Niemi rode for the White City Rebels in the British League from 1976 to 1978, winning the league championship with the team in 1977. He continued riding in Britain until 1986 for other teams including: Eastbourne Eagles (1979–81), Birmingham Brummies (1981), Wimbledon Dons (1982–83), Ipswich Witches (1984-85) and the Swindon Robins (1986)

In 1982 he won the London Riders' Championship with Wimbledon. He also won the British League Knockout Cup in 1984 with Ipswich.

Niemi also rode for Finland in the World Pairs Final on five occasions with a best finish of 5th in Australia in 1982 with his brother-in-law Ari Koponen, and again in 1989 in Poland with Olli Tyrväinen. He also represented Finland in the World Team Cup, though the Fins never progressed past the Semi-final stage during his career.

In 1989 Niemi rode in 42 matches for Coventry Bees with an average of 5.06. Kai was bought in as a replacement for David Clarke, who left Coventry to join Cradley Heath Heathens.

World Final appearances

Individual World Championship
 1980 -  Göteborg, Ullevi - 8th - 8pts
 1982 -  Los Angeles, Memorial Coliseum - 12th - 5pts
 1984 -  Göteborg, Ullevi - 13th - 4pts
 1985 -  Bradford, Odsal Stadium - 4th - 10pts

World Pairs Championship
 1977 -  Manchester, Hyde Road (with Ila Teromaa) - 6th - 14pts (7)
 1979 -  Vojens, Vojens Speedway Center (with Ila Teromaa) - 7th - 7pts (7)
 1980 -  Krsko, Matija Gubec Stadium (with Ila Teromaa) - 6th - 14pts (6)
 1982 -  Sydney, Liverpool City Raceway (with Ari Koponen) - 5th - 16pts (12)
 1989 -  Leszno, Alfred Smoczyk Stadium (with Olli Tyrväinen) - 5th - 31pts (18)
 1990 -  Landshut, Ellermühle Stadium (with Olli Tyrväinen) - 5th - 31pts

References

1955 births
Living people
Finnish speedway riders
Birmingham Brummies riders
Eastbourne Eagles riders
Ipswich Witches riders
White City Rebels riders
Wimbledon Dons riders
Sportspeople from Pori